The 2008–09 ISAF Sailing World Cup was a series of sailing regattas staged during 2008–09 season. The series featured boats which feature at the Olympics and Paralympics.

Regattas

Results

2.4 Metre

Men's 470

Women's 470

49er

Women's Elliott 6m

Finn

Men's Laser

Women's Laser Radial

Men's RS:X

Women's RS:X

Women's SB20

SKUD 18

Sonar

Men's Star

Women's Yngling

References

External links
 Official website

2008-09
2008 in sailing
2009 in sailing